Federal Route 1518, or Jalan Utama Bukit Mendi-FELDA Chemomoi, is a federal road in Pahang, Malaysia. It connects FELDA Kemasul to Kemayan.

At most sections, the Federal Route 1518 was built under the JKR R5 road standard, allowing maximum speed limit of up to 90 km/h.

List of junctions and towns 

Malaysian Federal Roads